Gregory Herbert (May 19, 1947 – January 31, 1978) was an American jazz saxophonist and flautist.

Herbert started on alto saxophone at age 12. In 1964 he did a short stint in the Duke Ellington Orchestra, then studied at Temple University from 1965 to 1971. While a student he recorded with Pat Martino in 1968. From 1971 to 1975 he toured with Woody Herman, then played with Harold Danko in 1975 and the Thad Jones/Mel Lewis Orchestra from  1975 to 1977. Afterwards, he played briefly with Chuck Israels and Blood, Sweat and Tears.
Additionally, Herbert appeared on Chet Baker's Once Upon a Summertime in 1977 along with Harold Danko, Ron Carter and Mel Lewis.

Herbert died of a heroin overdose in Amsterdam in 1978. He never recorded a session as a leader.

Discography
With Chet Baker 
Once Upon a Summertime (Artists House, 1977)
With Johnny Coles
Katumbo (Dance) (Mainstream, 1971)
With Harold Danko
Harold Danko Quartet (Inner City, 1974)
With Woody Herman
Thundering Herd (Fantasy, 1974)
With Chuck Israels
National Jazz Ensemble (Chiaroscuro, 1975) 
With The Thad Jones/Mel Lewis Orchestra
Live in Munich (Horizon, 1976)
Suite for Pops (A&M Horizon, 1975)
Thad Jones/Mel Lewis Orchestra with Rhoda Scott (Barclay, 1976)
With Mel LewisMel Lewis and Friends (A&M/Horizon, 1977)
With Pat MartinoBaiyina (The Clear Evidence)'' (Prestige, 1968)

References

1947 births
1978 deaths
20th-century American male musicians
20th-century American saxophonists
American jazz saxophonists
American male saxophonists
American jazz flautists
Blood, Sweat & Tears members
Drug-related deaths in the Netherlands
American male jazz musicians
Temple University alumni
20th-century flautists